Cratoplastis catherinae is a moth of the family Erebidae first described by Walter Rothschild in 1916. It is found in Brazil, Paraguay and Guatemala.

References

Phaegopterina
Moths of South America
Moths described in 1916